
Yarpole is a village in the Croft and Yarpole civil parish,  Herefordshire, England, about  north-west of Leominster. The hamlet of Bicton is to the south, Bircher to the north-east and Croft to the west.

The village has a gastropub, The Bell, and a parish hall.

Church
The parish church of St Leonard's is Grade II* listed. Most of the building dates to the early 14th century, its oldest part being the 13th-century font. The church was restored and extended to designs by George Gilbert Scott in 1864. In 2009 the interior of the church was extensively reordered and a community shop and post office were built at the west end. Yarpole is one of several Herefordshire parishes whose belltower stands separate from the church. The Grade I listed tower dates to the 13th-century, the ground stage built of stone, with the roofs and upper stage timber-framed. It is one of a number of partly or largely timber-framed belltowers in Herefordshire. The dendrochronology dating of its main timbers to 1192 makes it one of the oldest timber-framed structures in England. The writer, painter and lawyer Fred Uhlman is buried in the churchyard.

References

Further reading

External links

Yarpole Group Parish Council

Villages in Herefordshire